Vijayalaya Choleeswaram in Narthamalai, a panchayat town in Pudukottai district in the South Indian state of Tamil Nadu, India, is a temple dedicated to the Hindu god Shiva. Constructed in the Dravida style and rock cut architecture, the temple is believed to have been built during the 9th century by Mutharaiyar dynasty kings, the cardinals of Pallavas, with later expansion from the Cholas. The rock-cut architecture is an early example of Cholan Art, continuing the tradition of the Pallavas. The other portions of Narthamalai houses the 8th century Jaina Abode, the Aluruttimalai Jain Caves. There are also two rock-cut caves, one of which houses twelve life size sculptures of Vishnu. The temple is considered one of the oldest stone temples in South India.

The temple is maintained and administered by Department of Archaeological Survey of India as a protected monument.

History

Narthamalai was originally called Nagaratharmalai on account of the business men (called Nagarathar in Tamil) who were active in business in the Trichy – Pudukottai – Madurai regions. The Nagarathars are attributed to the major contributions in terms of the canals, temples, and religious establishments in the region. Narthamalai was ruled from the 7th to 9th centuries by the Mutharaiyars who were feudatories of the Pallavas. The region was later captured by Medieval Cholas.

Though the temple is called Vijayalaya Choleeswaram, the temple was originally built by Muttaraiyar lieutenant, Sattan Paliyili, during the seventh regnal year of Pallava king Nripatungavarman during 862 CE. As per some accounts, the temple is believed to have been built by the first king of Medieval Cholas, Vijayalaya Chola (848–891 CE), but the view is highly debated. As per the inscriptions, immediately after the construction, the temple was damaged by rains and lightning. The restoration work was carried out by Tennavan Tamiladirayan.

In modern times, the temple is maintained and administered by archaeological department of India as a protected monument.

Architecture

The temple is located in Narthamalai, a rockyhill in Pudukottai district in southern Tamil Nadu. The other portions of Narthamalai houses the 8th century Jaina Abode, the Aluruttimalai Jain Caves. There are also two rock-cut caves, one of which houses twelve life-size sculptures of Vishnu. The temple is considered one of the oldest stone temples in South India.

The central shrine is surrounded by eight shrines, out of which six are still present. The main shrine faces west and the sanctum houses the image of Lingam, the aniconic representation of Shiva. The walls of the sanctum are plain, unlike later Chola temples that have niches to house different images. The sanctum is approached through an Arthamandapa – a hall supported by pillars. The pillars are ornamental, rectangular shaped on the bottom and the top, and octagonal shaped in the middle. The vimana, the shrine over the sanctum has a semi-spherical shape, having four storeys. The sanctum is guarded by Dvarapalas on either sides. The inscriptions are made on the base of the Dvarapalas.

There are also two rock-cut caves, one of which houses twelve life size sculptures of Vishnu. The two circular pilasters with circular shafts on four sides of the vimana indicates the antiquity of the temple. The feature is possibly termed Vrittasputitas in silpa texts like Shilparatna. Such a feature is otherwise found only in few other temples like Neyyadiappar Temple, Tillaistanam, Tiruttalinathar Temple in Thiruputhur, central shrine in Moovar Koil in Kodumbalur, Anantheswara temple in Udayarkudi and Kampaheswarar Temple, Thirubuvanam.

Gallery

Significance

The temple in a combined rock-cut and Dravidan architecture is an early example of Cholan Art, continuing the tradition of the Pallavas. It is believed that the temple was the inspiration for the Gangaikonda Cholesvarar Temple built by Rajendra Chola I (1014-44 CE). The sanctum (garbhagriha) has four storeys in Omkara, shape of Hindu symbol Om.
There were originally eight subsidiary shrines around the temple, out of which six still exist. Each of them is identical, with a semi-spherical top, and a four pillared Madapa at the front.

The Vimana, the shrine over the sanctum has sculptures of Uma, Shiva, Dakshinamurthy, and Saptamatrikas. The individual images retrieved from the place are maintained in the Pudukottia Government Museum. The temple is the foremost structural of the Chola kings, who would later on go on to make Great Living Chola Temples in the next 300 years, declared as UNESCO as a World Heritage Sites. The temple is first among South Indian temples to incorporate dravida and Vasara styles to be incorporated in the vimana.

References

Further reading

External links

Hindu temples in Pudukkottai district
Shiva temples in Pudukkottai district
Archaeological sites in Tamil Nadu
9th-century Hindu temples
Chola architecture